"Temperamental Love" is a song recorded by American recording artist Bridgit Mendler and Canadian rapper Devontée. It was written by Mendler and Devontée. With the two, alongside Powers Pleasant, Mischa Chillak & Spencer Bastian serving as producers for the track, "Temperamental Love" becomes the first song Mendler has co-produced. Following an announcement Mendler’s InstaStories on February 10, 2017, the song was released to streaming services and made available for digital download.

Background and composition

The production and melody of "Temperamental Love" has been compared to Diana Ross' "I'm Coming Out". Devontée's verses were also said to have an "old school hip hop nostalgia" to them. According to Devontée, "Temperamental Love" is about the highs, lows, hot, and cold. It's the balance of life. Some days the high temperature is -3 and sometimes the high is 100 and that is the same thing as relationships to ensure it's well rounded. The song generally portrays the ups and downs of long-distance relationships, with temperature metaphors mixed in.

Music video 
The music video for "Temperamental Love" premiered on Nylon magazine. It was directed by Mendler, Gibson Hazard, and Vlad Sepetov and features Mendler and Devontée Surrounded by hilly landscape as they exude personality and emotion.

Personnel 
 Bridgit Mendler – songwriting, producer, vocals
 Devontée – songwriting, producer, vocals
 Powers Pleasant – producer
 Mischa Chillak – producer
 Spencer Bastian – producer

Release history

References

2017 singles
2017 songs
Bridgit Mendler songs
Songs written by Bridgit Mendler